The Hilton Istanbul Bosphorus is a five star hotel in Istanbul, Turkey. Designed by Skidmore, Owings & Merrill, it opened in 1955 as the Istanbul Hilton and is the longest operating Hilton Hotel outside the United States.

Project

On December 19, 1950, Conrad N. Hilton revealed to the New York Times that he had recently reached an agreement with the Turkish government to build a new Hilton hotel in Istanbul with 300 rooms costing US$5 million. The U.S. governmental agency Economic Cooperation Administration (ECA) was the main financier of an investment project. Hilton would raise the operation's capital and run the hotels while keeping one third of the profits.

At the time, Istanbul was growing in tourism, economy, and commerce. The total number of rooms in Istanbul conforming to internationally acceptable comfort standards was 290. The project would more than double the city's accommodation capacity at the international level.

John Wilson Houser, vice-president of Hilton International, wrote a letter to Conrad N. Hilton on June 23, 1951 about the Soviet Union's intention to build a 1,000-room hotel in Istanbul similar to the Waldorf-Astoria Hotel in New York City, plans of which he had seen. Hilton Istanbul Bosphorus project thus became a factor in the Cold War US–Soviet rivalry.

The final contract between the Turkish Government and Hilton Hotels was signed on August 9, 1951. The necessary land and US$3 million of the investment capital were provided by Emekli Sandigi, the Turkish Pension Fund, and the remaining US$2 million by the ECA. Hilton International secured the initial operating rights for 20 years.

While being financed by Emekli Sandigi, which was the Turkish Pension Fund, and the U.S government through the Economic Cooperation Administration, securing this funding had called for other projects like The Park hotel of Istanbul, A subsidiary of Pan Am, and the Inter-Continental Hotels Cooperation to be bypassed.

Architecture and construction

The hotel was designed by the American architectural and engineering firm Skidmore, Owings and Merrill (SOM). Turkish architect Sedat Hakkı Eldem was appointed as an advisor.The design of the Hilton Istanbul Bosphorus was a joint collaboration by Sedad Hakki Eldem ( Turkish architect) and Gordon Bunshaft. They both come from the American firm called Skidmore, Owings and Merrill (SOM).

The Hilton Hotel was built upon the confiscated property of a former Armenian cemetery. The groundbreaking took place in the summer of 1952. German company Dyckerhoff, Widmann & Julius Berger was signed for the construction. The labor at the construction site was carried out by about 500 Turkish workers and engineers. White Portland cement, glass and structural steel came from Germany, marble and ceramic fittings from Italy, and aluminium window castings, air-conditioning units and elevators from the United States.

The building was erected on a green hillside with a panoramic view of the Bosphorus and is very close to the busy Taksim Square. The building is a combination of the modern lines of Gordon Bunshaft with the rich artistic and romantic elements of Ottoman and Turkish architecture, implemented by Sedat Hakkı Eldem. As an example of Orientalism, the roof of the main entrance, designed by Eldem, resembles a flying carpet. The decorative tiles came from Kütahya, and the carpets for the rooms covering   were woven in Konya by hand.

After completing the construction work in a record time of 21 months, the hotel became the largest in Eastern Europe and the Middle East.

The hotel was temporarily opened on May 20, 1955. The official opening took place in a ceremony on June 10, 1955 in presence of Conrad N. Hilton, Fahrettin Kerim Gökay, Governor and Mayor of Istanbul, as well as American guests and celebrities, who came the day before on a chartered flight. Among them were Terry Moore, Olivia de Havilland, Mona Freeman, Irene Dunne, Sonja Henie, Diana Lynn, Merle Oberon, Ann Miller, Lon McCallister, Keefe Brasselle, Leo Carrillo and Elaine Shepard.

Rooms, restaurants and facilities
In addition, the hotel offers 158 executive rooms and 13 suites. Restaurants at the hotel offers Indian cuisine, "Veranda Grill & Bar" for organic food and fish, "Bosphorus Terrace", "Lobby Lounge & Bar", "Pool Café" and "Dragon", which offers classical Chinese cuisine. Further facilities of the hotel are a Turkish bath, jacuzzi, sauna and steam room for relaxing.

Special Events And Projects 
The award ceremony by the 40th Istanbul film festival which had been put together by the Istanbul Foundation for culture and arts along with tourism ministry and the contributions of the culture, had been held at the Hilton Istanbul Bosphorus. It was in fact closed with this ceremony that was held at the Hilton Istanbul Bosphorus.  Before the Covid-19 pandemic had sprung, There was a project initiated by the Hilton Istanbul Bosphorus Hotel in 2018, titled  “Yerel Mutfak-Global Lezzet,” which translates to  “Local Kitchens-Global Tastes.” This project was organised to support seven women organisations coming from seven regions, and seven provinces. This project was made with a goal to incorporate regional Turkish cuisines as an addition to the hotel's kitchen, adding inclusivity for international guests. They hosted many events, each time capturing a different region in their  restaurant, while inviting aunties to teach the hotel's chefs the art of home cooking in the hotel kitchen. This was effective in capturing the authentic taste of their local cuisines. The main masterminds behind this project idea was Sule-Kadak, who was a communication consultant, and  Ferah Diba Yağan, who was the commercial director of the Hilton Istanbul Bosphorus. This project would've served as a brilliant addition to the hotel to further incorporate regional cuisines but unfortunately had to come to a halt due to the Covid-19 pandemic.

Notable guests
Hilton Istanbul Bosphorus hosted following important heads of state apart from numerous nobilities, politicians, sportspeople and celebrities:
 King Faisal II, Iraq
 King Hussein, Jordan
 Queen Elizabeth II, United Kingdom
 Charles de Gaulle, France
 Muhammad Zia-ul-Haq, Pakistan
 Rezā Shāh Pahlavi, Iran
 Rainier III, Prince of Monaco
 George W. Bush, USA

In popular culture

The hotel is recognisable in Jules Dassin's 1964 film "Topkapi", in an exterior shot that shows the hotel in which the main characters are staying as they plan their heist.

References 

Hotels in Istanbul
Istanbul
Modernist architecture in Turkey
Hotels established in 1955
Hotel buildings completed in 1955
Şişli
Turkish companies established in 1955